Atom Ant is a cartoon ant and superhero, created by Hanna-Barbera in 1965. Atom costarred in The Atom Ant/Secret Squirrel Show (sharing top billing with Secret Squirrel). In syndication, Atom Ant aired alongside Precious Pupp and The Hillbilly Bears. Reruns aired on cable on Cartoon Network and  Boomerang in the 1990s and 2000s.

Biography
Atom Ant (originally voiced by Howard Morris, then by Don Messick in later episodes) is a superhero ant who operated out of an anthill in the countryside, where he possessed such things as a mainframe computer and exercise equipment. His powers mostly consisted of the ability to fly, superspeed, incredible strength, and invulnerability. His catchphrase was "Up and at 'em, Atom Ant!" He was often contacted by the police, who sent him out on an assignment.

Some of these missions parodied the missions of Batman. The police force was constantly shown to be underfunded and inept, as they relied on Atom Ant to do all their police work. As seen in "Nobody's Fool," the only two police officers were the chief of police and deputy chief. The department only possessed one rusted patrol car. Atom Ant fights various villains, including recurring ones like Ferocious Flea (also voiced by Messick) and mad scientist Professor Von Gimmick.

List of episodes

Other appearances
 Atom Ant appeared in a comic book, Atom Ant #1, published by Gold Key/Western Publishing in January 1966.
 Atom Ant later appeared in Yogi's Ark Lark and its spin-off series Yogi's Gang, voiced again by Don Messick.
 In the early 1990s series, Yo Yogi! with Don Messick reprising Atom Ant. He appears as Jellystone Town's residential superhero. In the episode "Super Duper Snag," it was revealed that his Atomic Helmet is his source of power.
 Hi-Tech Software released a budget labeled computer game for the Commodore 64 in 1990 called Atom Ant: Up and Atom. The idea of the game is to fly and collect a certain amount of bombs scattered around high rise buildings and 'atomize' them in a special bubble-like device at the top of each area (a game design influenced by Tehkan's Bomb Jack).
 In 2000, Cartoon Network produced a short cartoon as a part of their "Groovies" series, called "We Must All Get Ready Now". Featuring Atom Ant as the lead character, the short contained several audio tracks from the Atom Ant cartoon, and some audio from the classic Cold War civil defense film, Duck and Cover. The short could formerly be seen as interstitial programming on Boomerang; its last time on the channel being June 1, 2014, due to the network's rebrand in January 2015. The short was directed by Jonas Odell, with its music by  Michael Kohler. Sometimes, at that point it was followed by another cartoon that Cartoon Network produced in their "Groovies" or "Shorties" series.
 Atom Ant appeared in Yogi's Treasure Hunt.
 Atom Ant as a picture made a cameo in the "Agent Penny" episode of the Super Secret Secret Squirrel segment of 2 Stupid Dogs.
 Atom Ant makes a cameo appearance in a MetLife television commercial that aired in 2012.
 Atom Ant's catchphrase, "Up and Atom!", is also used by comic book superhero Radioactive Man in The Simpsons.
 Atom Ant as a toy made a cameo in the What's New, Scooby-Doo? episode "Roller Ghoster Ride".
 Atom Ant is featured in the Harvey Birdman, Attorney at Law episode "Incredible Hippo" and voiced by Maurice LaMarche. He appears as the defendant accused of radioactive contamination by the EPA.
 Atom Ant makes a cameo in the direct-to-video film Scooby-Doo! Mask of the Blue Falcon in a framed picture.
 Atom Ant appeared in a back-up feature in Scooby Apocalypse.
 Atom Ant appears in the end credits of Scoob! as a new recruit of the Falcon Force, a new team made by the Blue Falcon. In this version, he has four arms.
 Atom Ant appears in the HBO Max original series Jellystone!.

Home video
The episode "Up And Atom" is available on the DVD Saturday Morning Cartoons 1960s Vol. 1.  The episode "Atom Ant Meets Karate Ant" is available on the DVD Saturday Morning Cartoons 1960s Vol. 2, as well as a part of the "A Sample of Boomerang" tape, from Cartoon Network's sister channel, Boomerang. The episode "The Big Gimmick" is available on the DVD Best of Warner Bros. 25 Cartoon Collection Hanna-Barbera. On October 6, 2015, Warner Archive released Atom Ant: The Complete Series on DVD in region 1 as part of their Hanna–Barbera Classics Collection. This is a Manufacture-on-Demand (MOD) release, available exclusively through Warner's online store and Amazon.com.

In 2016, The Atom Ant Show was made available for download via iTunes Store.

Both seasons of The Atom Ant Show are available on the streaming Boomerang (TV network) subscription app.

Voices
 Howard Morris as Atom Ant (Season One), Muscles' Boss
 Don Messick as Atom Ant (Season Two), Ferocious Flea, Mr. Muto, Narrator
 John Stephenson as Narrator
 Allan Melvin as Muscles, Big Fats Dynamo, additional voices
 Ted Cassidy as Opening Announcer (uncredited)

Production credits
 
  produced and directed by
   Joseph Barbera,
   William Hanna

 story by
  Tony Benedict, Warren Foster,
   Dalton Sandifer, Michael Maltese

  musical direction
   Ted Nichols

  story direction
   Alex Lovy, Lew Marshall,
   Paul Sommer, Art Scott,
   Steve Clark, Art Davis

  voices
   Don Messick, Howard Morris,
   Janet Waldo, Henry Corden,
   Alan Melvin, Paul Frees,
   Mel Blanc, Jean Vander Pyl

 aimation direction
 Charles A. Nichols

 production supervision
 Howard Hanson

 animation
 George Kreisl, Irv. Spence,
 Edward Aardal, Don Lusk,
 Bob Carr, Don Patterson,
 C. L. Hartman, Bill Hutten,
 Dick Lundy, Allan Wilzback,
 Carlo Vinci, Ken Southworth,
 Jack Parr, Rudy Cataldi,
 Jerry Hathcock, Louis Kachivas

 layout:
 Willie Ito, Richard Bickenbach,
 Brad Case, Lin Larsen,
 Homer Jonas, Bruce Bushman,
 Alex Ignatiev, Walt Clinton,
 Morris Gollub

 backgrounds
 Richard H. Thomas, Ron Dias,
 Fernando Montealegre,
 Bob Gentle, Fernando Arce

 camera
 Frank Paiker, Charles Flekal,
 Norm Stainback,
 Roy Wade, Frank Parrish

 film editing
 Warner Leighton, Donald A. Douglas,
 Larry Cowan, Greg Watson,
 Dan Finnerty, Tony Milch,
 Ken Spears, Edward Warschilka,
 Milton Krear

 sound direction
 Richard Olson

 Approved MPAA
 Certificate
 No. 19034

 RCA
 Sound
 Recording

 Atom
  Ant

  A
 Hanna-Barbera
   Production

  Screen Gems

  NBC
  Television
  Network

  1965
 /October
  /2nd

References

External links
 
 Atom Ant at Don Markstein's Toonopedia. Archived from the original on April 6, 2012.
 The Cartoon Scrapbook – Informational profile on Atom Ant.
 Atom Ant episode guide at the Big Cartoon DataBase

Television characters introduced in 1965
Hanna-Barbera characters
Animated television series about insects
Hanna-Barbera superheroes
NBC original programming
1960s American animated television series
1965 American television series debuts
1968 American television series endings
Animal superheroes
American children's animated action television series
American children's animated adventure television series
American children's animated comic science fiction television series
American children's animated science fantasy television series
American children's animated superhero television series
Television series by Hanna-Barbera
Television series by Screen Gems
Fictional ants
Roc (mythology)